Leon Wouters (18 June 1930 – 30 March 2015) was a Belgian football player and coach.

Career
He played as a defender for Antwerp, and he later managed Zwarte Leeuw.

References

1930 births
2015 deaths
Belgian footballers
Royal Antwerp F.C. players
Association football defenders
Belgian football managers